Vedrana Popovic (born 10 January 1992 in Jajce, Bosnia and Herzegovina) is an Australian football (soccer) player who last played for Australian W-League team Brisbane Roar.

Playing career
Popovic has played for Brisbane Roar, Melbourne Victory and Adelaide United in the Australian W-League.

In 2013, Popovic made her debut for Australia.

Honours
With Brisbane Roar:
 W-League Premiership: 2008–09
 W-League Championship: 2008–09

References

1992 births
Living people
Australian women's soccer players
Brisbane Roar FC (A-League Women) players
Melbourne Victory FC (A-League Women) players
Adelaide United FC (A-League Women) players
A-League Women players
Serbs of Bosnia and Herzegovina
People from Jajce
Expatriate women's soccer players in Australia
Bosnia and Herzegovina emigrants to Australia
Women's association football defenders